The 22nd district of the Texas House of Representatives contains part of Jefferson county. The current Representative is Christian Manuel, who was elected in 2023.

References 

22